Avery Carl Frix is a Choctaw American politician and businessman who served as a member of the Oklahoma House of Representatives from the 13th district between January 9, 2017, and November 2022.

In March 2022, he announced his retirement at the end of the term from the Oklahoma House of Representatives to  run for the open congressional seat in Oklahoma's 2nd congressional district.

Early life and education 
Frix is a native of Muskogee, Oklahoma. He earned a Bachelor of Business Administration degree in accounting from the University of Oklahoma in 2016.

Career

Oklahoma House of Representatives
Frix was elected to the Oklahoma House of Representatives in November 2016 and assumed office on January 9, 2017. Since 2019, he has served as chair of the House Transportation Committee. In 2021, Frix authored a failed bill to name a state highway after former President Donald Trump.

2022 Campaign for Oklahoma's 2nd
In March 2022, Frix declared his candidacy for Oklahoma's 2nd congressional district in the 2022 election. He was one of three Choctaw tribal members in the race, alongside Dustin Roberts, another Oklahoma House of Representatives member, and Josh Brecheen, a former Oklahoma state senator. In the Republican primary, he placed first with 14.7% of the vote out of a field of 14 candidates, and faced Josh Brecheen in the August 23 runoff. He lost the runoff election to Brecheen.

Electoral history

References 

1994 births
21st-century American politicians
21st-century Native American politicians
Candidates in the 2022 United States House of Representatives elections
Living people
Republican Party members of the Oklahoma House of Representatives
Choctaw Nation of Oklahoma state legislators in Oklahoma
People from Muskogee, Oklahoma
University of Oklahoma alumni